A Mother's Secret is a 1918 American silent drama film directed by Douglas Gerrard and written by Lois Zellner. The film stars Ella Hall and Emory Johnson. The film was released on April 29, 1918, by Universal.

Plot

Cast
{| 
! style="width: 180px; text-align: left;" |  Actor
! style="width: 230px; text-align: left;" |  Role
|- style="text-align: left;"
|Ella Hall||Angela
|-
|Mary Mersch||Lady Eldone
|-
|T.D. Crittenden||Captain Eldone
|-
|Emory Johnson||Howard Grey
|-
| Mrs. L.C. Harris || Mammy
|-
| Grace McLean || Rose Marie
|-
|}

Preservation Status
According to the Library of Congress website, no known copies of this movie survive.

References

External links

American silent feature films
American black-and-white films
Films directed by Douglas Gerrard
1910s English-language films
1910s American films